The  Washoe Tribe of Nevada and California are a federally recognized tribe of Washoe Indians, living in California and Nevada. They are several communities south and east of Lake Tahoe united under a tribal council.

Government
The tribe is headquartered in Gardnerville, Nevada and governed by a democratically elected twelve-member tribal council and chairman, which meet on a monthly basis. Chairmen serve four-year terms.

The current administration is:
Chairman: Serrell Smokey
Vice-chairman: Rueben Vasquez
Secretary/Treasurer: Autumn Burtt
Carson Colony Council Members: Roger McDonald and Chad Malone
Dresslerville Community Council Members: Rueben Vasquez and Herman Fillmore
Off-Reservation Council Members: Jeanine Jim-Bluehorse and Helen Fillmore
Reno-Sparks Council Member: Lorraine Keller
Stewart Community Council Members: Blain Osorio and Darrel Kizer
Woodfords Community Council Members: Irvin Jim and Shannon Guerrero.

Communities

Carson Colony
Established in 1917, the  community had 275 resident members in 1991. This colony is located in Carson City, Nevada and owns a gymnasium for recreation, youth programs, and hosting tribal events. The colony has four community representatives.

Dresslerville Colony

This is the largest Washoe community in population. 348 members lived there in 1991. Most of the tribe's public buildings are here, including a community center, gymnasium, and park. They have five community representatives.

Stewart Community
Located at the south side of Carson City, this community was established in 1890, has , with 90 members. They have the Stewart Community Center. Their five community representatives are chaired by Wanda Batchelor.

Washoe Ranch
This  ranch in Carson Valley was purchased by the tribe in 1938 and 1940. There the tribe collectively raised hogs, sheep, and a herd of dairy cows. They grew potatoes and peaches. When farm production decreased in the 1950s, the land was temporarily leased to non-Native farmers.

Woodfords Community (Hung A Lei Ti)

The only community in California, Woodfords Community is located near Markleeville. Its Washoe name is "Hung A Lei Ti." It includes the Woodfords Indian Education Center and a community center. Their five community representatives are chaired by DeAnn Roberts. Established in 1970, the  community had 338 resident members in 1991.  As of the 2010 Census the population was 214. In July 2021, Hung A Lei Ti was evacuated for seven days due to the Tamarack Fire. The community was successfully protected from the fire.

The California Gold Rush brought an influx of European-American settlers in the mid-19th century. Calls for the establishment of a Washoe reservation and compensation for lost resources, such as the piñon crop, were ignored by the US in the late 19th century. Under the Dawes Act of 1887, Washoes lands were broken up into individual allotments; however, instead of the tribe retaining valuable lands in the Pine Nut Mountains, the allotted sections were typically barren lands with little access to water.

In the early 20th century, Washoes worked as ranch hands, as construction workers, domestic servants, or laundry workers. Cattle ranchers leased Washoe land for minimal amounts of money. In 1917, the US government, despite local protest, purchased a tract of land for the Washoe, that became the Carson Colony. William F. Dressler donated , also in 1917, that became the Dresslerville Colony.
</ref> The novel Rabbit Boss by Thomas Sanchez depicts the evolving circumstances of tribal members over a 100-year span ending in the mid-20th century.

Under the Indian Reorganization Act, the colonies in the Carson Valley area wrote a new constitution and by-laws, which they ratified on December 16, 1935. They gained federal recognition on January 24, 1936.

In 1948, the tribe began preparing a case for the Indian Claims Commission. They filed Washoe Case #288 before the ICC in 1951, asking for $43.8 million for land, fishing and hunting rights, minerals, and timber that had been wrongly taken from the tribe, plus interest accrued since 1863. The case was finally settled in 1970, when the tribe was only awarded $5 million.

In the 1960s, John Henry Dressler helped to form the Inter-Tribal Council of Nevada, a liaison between tribal, state, and federal agencies. Since 1966, the council has nine representatives: two from Dresslerville Colony, two from Woodfords Colony, one from the Washoe of Reno-Sparks Indian Colony, and two from off-reservation areas.

See also
Reno-Sparks Indian Colony
Susanville Indian Rancheria
Washoe people

Notes

References
 D'Azevedo, Warren L. "Washoe." Handbook of North American Indians: Great Basin, Volume 11. Washington, DC: Smithsonian Institution, 1986. .
 Pritzker, Barry M. A Native American Encyclopedia: History, Culture, and Peoples. Oxford: Oxford University Press, 2000. .

External links
 Washoe Tribe of Nevada and California , official website
 Meeks Bay Resort & Marina, operated by the Washoe Tribe (official website)
A Guide to the Indian Claims Commission claims case no. 288, NC443. Special Collections, University Libraries, University of Nevada, Reno. This collection consists of materials accumulated by the Washoe Tribe during litigation of their claims case before the Indian Claims Commission

Washoe tribe
Native American tribes in California
Native American tribes in Nevada
American Indian reservations in California
American Indian reservations in Nevada
Populated places in Alpine County, California
Populated places in Douglas County, Nevada
Federally recognized tribes in the United States